Michael York is a UK-based American Religious Studies scholar who specializes in the study of pre-Christian European religion and its relation to contemporary Paganism. In 2003, he published Pagan Theology, in which he put forward the idea that the ancient pre-Christian and pre-Islamic religions of Eurasia, indigenous religions from across the globe, and contemporary Pagan faiths could all be constituted as forms of paganism. Michael York participated in TEDxLambeth 2019 as a speaker.

Personal life
Describing his own religious beliefs and his affection for paganism, York remarked that:

If I had to name my own denominational predilection, I would say that I am a "religionist." I believe in religion itself and its central role in expanding human consciousness above and beyond immediate daily concerns. I see religion as an ongoing dialogue that questions the purpose of life and our terrestrial incarnations. In my own pursuit and love of religion as religion, I have been particularly attracted to paganism not only as the source and origin of all religion but also as an organic alternative to the institutionalized and parochial insularity that much religious expression has become.

Bibliography

Books

References

Footnotes

Bibliography
 

Pagan studies scholars
American religion academics
Living people
American expatriate academics
American modern pagans
Modern pagan writers
Year of birth missing (living people)